Bryotropha terrella is a moth of the family Gelechiidae. It is the type species of the genus Bryotropha. It is found in Europe.

The wingspan is 14–16 mm. The forewings are mixed brown, ochreous brown and fuscous. The hindwings are grey, but darker towards the apex. The moths are on wing from May to August depending on the location.

The larvae feed on various mosses and grasses, including Rhytidiadelphus squarrosus, Syntrichia ruraliformis, Hypnum jutlandicum, Calliergonella cuspidata and Agrostis capillaris. They live in a silken gallery. The larvae have a dull reddish brown body and a black head. It is a common species, often found wherever long grass grows, and easily flushed in the daytime.

References

External links
 UK Moths
 Lepidoptera of Belgium
 Microlepidoptera.nl 

Moths described in 1775
terrella
Moths of Europe